William Blackie (born 4 October 1963) was a Scottish footballer who played for Dunfermline Athletic, Berwick Rangers, Cowdenbeath, Forfar Athletic, Dumbarton, Alloa Athletic and St Johnstone.
Consistently running sub 11 seconds in 100m trials Billy was widely acknowledged as the fastest man in Scottish football and gave up a promising career as a sprinter to spend time on football.

References

1963 births
Scottish footballers
Dumbarton F.C. players
Dunfermline Athletic F.C. players
Forfar Athletic F.C. players
Alloa Athletic F.C. players
Cowdenbeath F.C. players
Berwick Rangers F.C. players
St Johnstone F.C. players
Scottish Football League players
Living people
Footballers from Edinburgh
Association football forwards